Bagila railway station is a Kolkata Suburban Railway station on the Howrah–Bardhaman main line operated by Eastern Railway zone of Indian Railways. It is situated beside National Highway 2 at Kalshi, Bagila, Purba Bardhaman district in the Indian state of West Bengal. Number of EMU trains stop at Bagila railway station.

History
Bandel to Bardhaman rout was opened for traffic on 1 January 1885. Electrification of the Howrah–Bardhaman main line was initiated up to Bandel in 1957, with the 3000V DC system, and the entire Howrah–Bardhaman route including Bagila railway station completed with AC system, along with conversion of earlier DC portions to 25 kV AC, in 1958.

References

Railway stations in Purba Bardhaman district
Kolkata Suburban Railway stations
Howrah railway division